Drury is an unincorporated community in Douglas County, Missouri, United States. It is located approximately fifteen miles south of Mountain Grove and about three miles south of Vanzant on Route 95.

Drury had a post office from 1893 until 2003, using zip code 65638. The community has the name of the local Drury family.

References

Unincorporated communities in Douglas County, Missouri
Unincorporated communities in Missouri
1893 establishments in Missouri